南海, meaning "South Sea" in Chinese and Japanese, Korean may refer to:

 Nanhai (disambiguation), the Chinese pinyin transliteration
 Nankai (disambiguation), the Japanese transliteration
 Namhae (disambiguation), the Korean transliteration